Banilad may refer to any of the following barangays in the Philippines:
 Banilad, Bacong, Negros Oriental
 Banilad, Cebu City
 Banilad, Dumaguete, Negros Oriental
 Banilad, Mandaue
 Banilad, Majayjay, Laguna
 Banilad, Nagcarlan, Laguna
 Banilad, Nasugbu, Batangas
 Banilad, Pinamalayan, Oriental Mindoro
 Banilad, Tayabas, Quezon